High-definition television (HD or HDTV) describes a television system which provides a substantially higher image resolution than the previous generation of technologies. The term has been used since 1936; in more recent times, it refers to the generation following standard-definition television (SDTV), often abbreviated to HDTV or HD-TV. It is the current de facto standard video format used in most broadcasts: terrestrial broadcast television, cable television, satellite television and Blu-ray Discs.

Formats 
HDTV may be transmitted in various formats:
 720p (1280 horizontal pixels × 720 lines): 921,600 pixels
 1080i (1920×1080) interlaced scan: 1,036,800 pixels (~1.04 MP).
 1080p (1920×1080) progressive scan: 2,073,600 pixels (~2.07 MP).
 Some countries also use a non-standard CEA resolution, such as 1440×1080i: 777,600 pixels (~0.78 MP) per field or 1,555,200 pixels (~1.56 MP) per frame

When transmitted at two megapixels per frame, HDTV provides about five times as many pixels as SD (standard-definition television). The increased resolution provides for a clearer, more detailed picture. In addition, progressive scan and higher frame rates result in a picture with less flicker and better rendering of fast motion. HDTV as is known today first started official broadcasting in 1989 in Japan, under the MUSE/Hi-Vision analog system. HDTV was widely adopted worldwide in the late 2000s.

History

The term high definition once described a series of television systems originating from August 1936; however, these systems were only high definition when compared to earlier systems that were based on mechanical systems with as few as 30 lines of resolution. The ongoing competition between companies and nations to create true "HDTV" spanned the entire 20th century, as each new system became higher definition than the last. In the 2010s, this race has continued with 4K, 5K and 8K systems.

The British high-definition TV service started trials in August 1936 and a regular service on 2 November 1936 using both the (mechanical) Baird 240 line sequential scan (later to be inaccurately rechristened 'progressive') and the (electronic) Marconi-EMI 405 line interlaced systems. The Baird system was discontinued in February 1937. In 1938 France followed with its own 441-line system, variants of which were also used by a number of other countries. The US NTSC 525-line system joined in 1941. In 1949 France introduced an even higher-resolution standard at 819 lines, a system that should have been high definition even by today's standards, but was monochrome only and the technical limitations of the time prevented it from achieving the definition of which it should have been capable. All of these systems used interlacing and a 4:3 aspect ratio except the 240-line system which was progressive (actually described at the time by the technically correct term "sequential") and the 405-line system which started as 5:4 and later changed to 4:3. The 405-line system adopted the (at that time) revolutionary idea of interlaced scanning to overcome the flicker problem of the 240-line with its 25 Hz frame rate. The 240-line system could have doubled its frame rate but this would have meant that the transmitted signal would have doubled in bandwidth, an unacceptable option as the video baseband bandwidth was required to be not more than 3 MHz.

Color broadcasts started at similar line counts, first with the US NTSC color system in 1953, which was compatible with the earlier monochrome systems and therefore had the same 525 lines per frame. European standards did not follow until the 1960s, when the PAL and SECAM color systems were added to the monochrome 625-line broadcasts.

The NHK (Japan Broadcasting Corporation) began conducting research to "unlock the fundamental mechanism of video and sound interactions with the five human senses" in 1964, after the Tokyo Olympics. NHK set out to create an HDTV system that ended up scoring much higher in subjective tests than NTSC's previously dubbed "HDTV". This new system, NHK Color, created in 1972, included 1125 lines, a 5:3 aspect ratio and 60 Hz refresh rate. The Society of Motion Picture and Television Engineers (SMPTE), headed by Charles Ginsburg, became the testing and study authority for HDTV technology in the international theater. SMPTE would test HDTV systems from different companies from every conceivable perspective, but the problem of combining the different formats plagued the technology for many years.

There were four major HDTV systems tested by SMPTE in the late 1970s, and in 1979 an SMPTE study group released A Study of High Definition Television Systems:

 EIA monochrome: 4:3 aspect ratio, 1023 lines, 60 Hz
 NHK color: 5:3 aspect ratio, 1125 lines, 60 Hz
 NHK monochrome: 4:3 aspect ratio, 2125 lines, 50 Hz
 BBC colour: 8:3 aspect ratio, 1501 lines, 60 Hz

Since the formal adoption of digital video broadcasting's (DVB) widescreen HDTV transmission modes in the mid to late 2000s; the 525-line NTSC (and PAL-M) systems, as well as the European 625-line PAL and SECAM systems, are now regarded as standard definition television systems.

Analog systems

Early HDTV broadcasting used analog technology, but today it is transmitted digitally and uses video compression.

In 1949, France started its transmissions with an 819 lines system (with 737 active lines). The system was monochrome only and was used only on VHF for the first French TV channel. It was discontinued in 1983.

In 1958, the Soviet Union developed Тransformator (meaning Transformer), the first high-resolution (definition) television system capable of producing an image composed of 1,125 lines of resolution aimed at providing teleconferencing for military command. It was a research project and the system was never deployed by either the military or consumer broadcasting.

In 1986, the European Community proposed HD-MAC, an analog HDTV system with 1,152 lines. A public demonstration took place for the 1992 Summer Olympics in Barcelona. However HD-MAC was scrapped in 1993 and the Digital Video Broadcasting (DVB) project was formed, which would foresee development of a digital HDTV standard.

Japan
In 1979, the Japanese public broadcaster NHK first developed consumer high-definition television with a 5:3 display aspect ratio. The system, known as Hi-Vision or MUSE after its multiple sub-Nyquist sampling encoding (MUSE) for encoding the signal, required about twice the bandwidth of the existing NTSC system but provided about four times the resolution (1035i/1125 lines). In 1981, the MUSE system was demonstrated for the first time in the United States, using the same 5:3 aspect ratio as the Japanese system. Upon visiting a demonstration of MUSE in Washington, US President Ronald Reagan was impressed and officially declared it "a matter of national interest" to introduce HDTV to the US. NHK taped the 1984 Summer Olympics with a Hi-Vision camera, weighing 40 kg.

Satellite test broadcasts started June 4, 1989, the first daily high-definition programs in the world, with regular testing starting on November 25, 1991, or "Hi-Vision Day"dated exactly to refer to its 1,125-lines resolution. Regular broadcasting of BS-9ch commenced on November 25, 1994, which featured commercial and NHK programming.

Several systems were proposed as the new standard for the US, including the Japanese MUSE system, but all were rejected by the FCC because of their higher bandwidth requirements. At this time, the number of television channels was growing rapidly and bandwidth was already a problem. A new standard had to be more efficient, needing less bandwidth for HDTV than the existing NTSC.

Decrease of analog HD systems
The limited standardization of analog HDTV in the 1990s did not lead to global HDTV adoption as technical and economic constraints at the time did not permit HDTV to use bandwidths greater than normal television. Early HDTV commercial experiments, such as NHK's MUSE, required over four times the bandwidth of a standard-definition broadcast. Despite efforts made to reduce analog HDTV to about twice the bandwidth of SDTV, these television formats were still distributable only by satellite. In Europe too, the HD-MAC standard was considered not technically viable.

In addition, recording and reproducing an HDTV signal was a significant technical challenge in the early years of HDTV (Sony HDVS). Japan remained the only country with successful public broadcasting of analog HDTV, with seven broadcasters sharing a single channel.

However, the Hi-Vision/MUSE system also faced commercial issues when it launched on November 25, 1991. Only 2,000 HDTV sets were sold by that day, rather than the enthusiastic 1.32 million estimation. Hi-Vision sets were very expensive, up to US$30,000 each, which contributed to its low consumer adaption. A Hi-Vision VCR from NEC released at Christmas time retailed for US$115,000. In addition, the United States saw Hi-Vision/MUSE as an outdated system and had already made it clear that it would develop an all-digital system. Experts thought the commercial Hi-Vision system in 1992 was already eclipsed by digital technology developed in the U.S. since 1990. This was an American victory against the Japanese in terms of technological dominance. By mid-1993 prices of receivers were still as high as 1.5 million yen (US$15,000).

On February 23, 1994, a top broadcasting administrator in Japan admitted failure of its analog-based HDTV system, saying the U.S. digital format would be more likely a worldwide standard. However this announcement drew angry protests from broadcasters and electronic companies who invested heavily into the analog system. As a result, he took back his statement the next day saying that the government will continue to promote Hi-Vision/MUSE. That year NHK started development of digital television in an attempt to catch back up to America and Europe. This resulted in the ISDB format. Japan started digital satellite and HDTV broadcasting in December 2000.

Rise of digital compression
High-definition digital television was not possible with uncompressed video, which requires a bandwidth exceeding 1Gbit/s for studio-quality HD digital video. Digital HDTV was made possible by the development of discrete cosine transform (DCT) video compression. DCT coding is a lossy image compression technique that was first proposed by Nasir Ahmed in 1972, and was later adapted into a motion-compensated DCT algorithm for video coding standards such as the H.26x formats from 1988 onwards and the MPEG formats from 1993 onwards. Motion-compensated DCT compression significantly reduces the amount of bandwidth required for a digital TV signal. By 1991, it had achieved data compression ratios from 8:1 to 14:1 for near-studio-quality HDTV transmission, down to 70140 Mbit/s. Between 1988 and 1991, DCT video compression was widely adopted as the video coding standard for HDTV implementations, enabling the development of practical digital HDTV. Dynamic random-access memory (DRAM) was also adopted as framebuffer semiconductor memory, with the DRAM semiconductor industry's increased manufacturing and reducing prices important to the commercialization of HDTV.

Since 1972, International Telecommunication Union's radio telecommunications sector (ITU-R) had been working on creating a global recommendation for Analog HDTV. These recommendations, however, did not fit in the broadcasting bands which could reach home users. The standardization of MPEG-1 in 1993 led to the acceptance of recommendations ITU-R BT.709. In anticipation of these standards, the Digital Video Broadcasting (DVB) organisation was formed. It was alliance of broadcasters, consumer electronics manufacturers and regulatory bodies. The DVB develops and agrees upon specifications which are formally standardised by ETSI.

DVB created first the standard for DVB-S digital satellite TV, DVB-C digital cable TV and DVB-T digital terrestrial TV. These broadcasting systems can be used for both SDTV and HDTV. In the US the Grand Alliance proposed ATSC as the new standard for SDTV and HDTV. Both ATSC and DVB were based on the MPEG-2 standard, although DVB systems may also be used to transmit video using the newer and more efficient H.264/MPEG-4 AVC compression standards. Common for all DVB standards is the use of highly efficient modulation techniques for further reducing bandwidth, and foremost for reducing receiver-hardware and antenna requirements.

In 1983, the International Telecommunication Union's radio telecommunications sector (ITU-R) set up a working party (IWP11/6) with the aim of setting a single international HDTV standard. One of the thornier issues concerned a suitable frame/field refresh rate, the world already having split into two camps, 25/50 Hz and 30/60 Hz, largely due to the differences in mains frequency. The IWP11/6 working party considered many views and throughout the 1980s served to encourage development in a number of video digital processing areas, not least conversion between the two main frame/field rates using motion vectors, which led to further developments in other areas. While a comprehensive HDTV standard was not in the end established, agreement on the aspect ratio was achieved.

Initially the existing 5:3 aspect ratio had been the main candidate but, due to the influence of widescreen cinema, the aspect ratio 16:9 (1.78) eventually emerged as being a reasonable compromise between 5:3 (1.67) and the common 1.85 widescreen cinema format. An aspect ratio of 16:9 was duly agreed upon at the first meeting of the IWP11/6 working party at the BBC's Research and Development establishment in Kingswood Warren. The resulting ITU-R Recommendation ITU-R BT.709-2 ("Rec. 709") includes the 16:9 aspect ratio, a specified colorimetry, and the scan modes 1080i (1,080 actively interlaced lines of resolution) and 1080p (1,080 progressively scanned lines). The British Freeview HD trials used MBAFF, which contains both progressive and interlaced content in the same encoding.

It also includes the alternative 1440×1152 HDMAC scan format. (According to some reports, a mooted 750-line (720p) format (720 progressively scanned lines) was viewed by some at the ITU as an enhanced television format rather than a true HDTV format, and so was not included, although 1920×1080i and 1280×720p systems for a range of frame and field rates were defined by several US SMPTE standards.)

Inaugural HDTV broadcast in the United States
HDTV technology was introduced in the United States in the early 1990s and made official in 1993 by the Digital HDTV Grand Alliance, a group of television, electronic equipment, communications companies consisting of AT&T Bell Labs, General Instrument, Philips, Sarnoff, Thomson, Zenith and the Massachusetts Institute of Technology. Field testing of HDTV at 199 sites in the United States was completed August 14, 1994. The first public HDTV broadcast in the United States occurred on July 23, 1996, when the Raleigh, North Carolina television station WRAL-HD began broadcasting from the existing tower of WRAL-TV southeast of Raleigh, winning a race to be first with the HD Model Station in Washington, D.C., which began broadcasting July 31, 1996 with the callsign WHD-TV, based out of the facilities of NBC owned and operated station WRC-TV. The American Advanced Television Systems Committee (ATSC) HDTV system had its public launch on October 29, 1998, during the live coverage of astronaut John Glenn's return mission to space on board the Space Shuttle Discovery. The signal was transmitted coast-to-coast, and was seen by the public in science centers, and other public theaters specially equipped to receive and display the broadcast.

European HDTV broadcasts
Between 1988 and 1991, several European organizations were working on discrete cosine transform (DCT) based digital video coding standards for both SDTV and HDTV. The EU 256 project by the CMTT and ETSI, along with research by Italian broadcaster RAI, developed a DCT video codec that broadcast near-studio-quality HDTV transmission at about 70140 Mbit/s. The first HDTV transmissions in Europe, albeit not direct-to-home, began in 1990, when RAI broadcast the 1990 FIFA World Cup using several experimental HDTV technologies, including the digital DCT-based EU 256 codec, the mixed analog-digital HD-MAC technology, and the analog MUSE technology. The matches were shown in 8 cinemas in Italy, where the tournament was played, and 2 in Spain. The connection with Spain was made via the Olympus satellite link from Rome to Barcelona and then with a fiber optic connection from Barcelona to Madrid. After some HDTV transmissions in Europe, the standard was abandoned in 1993, to be replaced by a digital format from DVB.

The first regular broadcasts started on January 1, 2004, when the Belgian company Euro1080 launched the HD1 channel with the traditional Vienna New Year's Concert. Test transmissions had been active since the IBC exhibition in September 2003, but the New Year's Day broadcast marked the official launch of the HD1 channel, and the official start of direct-to-home HDTV in Europe.

Euro1080, a division of the former and now bankrupt Belgian TV services company Alfacam, broadcast HDTV channels to break the pan-European stalemate of "no HD broadcasts mean no HD TVs bought means no HD broadcasts ..." and kick-start HDTV interest in Europe. The HD1 channel was initially free-to-air and mainly comprised sporting, dramatic, musical and other cultural events broadcast with a multi-lingual soundtrack on a rolling schedule of 4 or 5 hours per day.

These first European HDTV broadcasts used the 1080i format with MPEG-2 compression on a DVB-S signal from SES's Astra 1H satellite. Euro1080 transmissions later changed to MPEG-4/AVC compression on a DVB-S2 signal in line with subsequent broadcast channels in Europe.

Despite delays in some countries, the number of European HD channels and viewers has risen steadily since the first HDTV broadcasts, with SES's annual Satellite Monitor market survey for 2010 reporting more than 200 commercial channels broadcasting in HD from Astra satellites, 185 million HD capable TVs sold in Europe (£60 million in 2010 alone), and 20 million households (27% of all European digital satellite TV homes) watching HD satellite broadcasts (16 million via Astra satellites).

In December 2009, the United Kingdom became the first European country to deploy high-definition content using the new DVB-T2 transmission standard, as specified in the Digital TV Group (DTG) D-book, on digital terrestrial television.

The Freeview HD service currently contains 13 HD channels and was rolled out region by region across the UK in accordance with the digital switchover process, finally being completed in October 2012. However, Freeview HD is not the first HDTV service over digital terrestrial television in Europe; Italy's Rai HD channel started broadcasting in 1080i on April 24, 2008, using the DVB-T transmission standard.

In October 2008, France deployed five high definition channels using DVB-T transmission standard on digital terrestrial distribution.

Notation
HDTV broadcast systems are identified with three major parameters:

 Frame size in pixels is defined as number of horizontal pixels × number of vertical pixels, for example 1280 × 720 or 1920 × 1080. Often the number of horizontal pixels is implied from context and is omitted, as in the case of 720p and 1080p.
 Scanning system is identified with the letter p for progressive scanning or i for interlaced scanning.
 Frame rate is identified as number of video frames per second. For interlaced systems, the number of frames per second should be specified, but it is not uncommon to see the field rate incorrectly used instead.

If all three parameters are used, they are specified in the following form: [frame size][scanning system][frame or field rate] or [frame size]/[frame or field rate][scanning system]. Often, frame size or frame rate can be dropped if its value is implied from context. In this case, the remaining numeric parameter is specified first, followed by the scanning system.

For example, 1920×1080p25 identifies progressive scanning format with 25 frames per second, each frame being 1,920 pixels wide and 1,080 pixels high. The 1080i25 or 1080i50 notation identifies interlaced scanning format with 25 frames (50 fields) per second, each frame being 1,920 pixels wide and 1,080 pixels high. The 1080i30 or 1080i60 notation identifies interlaced scanning format with 30 frames (60 fields) per second, each frame being 1,920 pixels wide and 1,080 pixels high. The 720p60 notation identifies progressive scanning format with 60 frames per second, each frame being 720 pixels high; 1,280 pixels horizontally are implied.

Systems using 50 Hz support three scanning rates: 50i, 25p and 50p, while 60 Hz systems support a much wider set of frame rates: 59.94i, 60i, 23.976p, 24p, 29.97p, 30p, 59.94p and 60p. In the days of standard-definition television, the fractional rates were often rounded up to whole numbers, e.g. 23.976p was often called 24p, or 59.94i was often called 60i. Sixty Hertz high definition television supports both fractional and slightly different integer rates, therefore strict usage of notation is required to avoid ambiguity. Nevertheless, 29.97p/59.94i is almost universally called 60i, likewise 23.976p is called 24p.

For the commercial naming of a product, the frame rate is often dropped and is implied from context (e.g., a 1080i television set). A frame rate can also be specified without a resolution. For example, 24p means 24 progressive scan frames per second, and 50i means 25 interlaced frames per second.

There is no single standard for HDTV color support. Colors are typically broadcast using a (10-bits per channel) YUV color space but, depending on the underlying image generating technologies of the receiver, are then subsequently converted to a RGB color space using standardized algorithms. When transmitted directly through the Internet, the colors are typically pre-converted to 8-bit RGB channels for additional storage savings with the assumption that it will only be viewed only on a (sRGB) computer screen. As an added benefit to the original broadcasters, the losses of the pre-conversion essentially make these files unsuitable for professional TV re-broadcasting.

Most HDTV systems support resolutions and frame rates defined either in the ATSC table 3, or in EBU specification. The most common are noted below.

Display resolutions

At a minimum, HDTV has twice the linear resolution of standard-definition television (SDTV), thus showing greater detail than either analog television or regular DVD. The technical standards for broadcasting HDTV also handle the 16:9 aspect ratio images without using letterboxing or anamorphic stretching, thus increasing the effective image resolution.

A very high-resolution source may require more bandwidth than available in order to be transmitted without loss of fidelity. The lossy compression that is used in all digital HDTV storage and transmission systems will distort the received picture when compared to the uncompressed source.

Standard frame or field rates
ATSC and DVB define the following frame rates for use with the various broadcast standards:

 23.976 Hz (film-looking frame rate compatible with NTSC clock speed standards)
 24 Hz (international film and ATSC high-definition material)
 25 Hz (PAL film, DVB standard-definition and high-definition material)
 29.97 Hz (NTSC film and standard-definition material)
 30 Hz (NTSC film, ATSC high-definition material)
 50 Hz (DVB high-definition material)
 59.94 Hz (ATSC high-definition material)
 60 Hz (ATSC high-definition material)

The optimum format for a broadcast depends upon the type of videographic recording medium used and the image's characteristics. For best fidelity to the source, the transmitted field ratio, lines, and frame rate should match those of the source.

PAL, SECAM and NTSC frame rates technically apply only to analogue standard-definition television, not to digital or high definition broadcasts. However, with the rollout of digital broadcasting, and later HDTV broadcasting, countries retained their heritage systems. HDTV in former PAL and SECAM countries operates at a frame rate of 25/50 Hz, while HDTV in former NTSC countries operates at 30/60 Hz.

Types of media
High-definition image sources include terrestrial broadcast, direct broadcast satellite, digital cable, IPTV, Blu-ray video disc (BD), and internet downloads.

In the US, residents in the line of sight of television station broadcast antennas can receive free, over-the-air programming with a television set with an ATSC tuner via a TV aerial. Laws prohibit homeowners' associations and city government from banning the installation of antennas.

Standard 35mm photographic film used for cinema projection has a much higher image resolution than HDTV systems, and is exposed and projected at a rate of 24 frames per second (frame/s). To be shown on standard television, in PAL-system countries, cinema film is scanned at the TV rate of 25 frame/s, causing a speedup of 4.1 percent, which is generally considered acceptable. In NTSC-system countries, the TV scan rate of 30 frame/s would cause a perceptible speedup if the same were attempted, and the necessary correction is performed by a technique called 3:2 pulldown: Over each successive pair of film frames, one is held for three video fields (1/20 of a second) and the next is held for two video fields (1/30 of a second), giving a total time for the two frames of 1/12 of a second and thus achieving the correct average film frame rate.

Non-cinematic HDTV video recordings intended for broadcast are typically recorded either in 720p or 1080i format as determined by the broadcaster. 720p is commonly used for Internet distribution of high-definition video, because most computer monitors operate in progressive-scan mode. 720p also imposes less strenuous storage and decoding requirements compared to both 1080i and 1080p. 1080p/24, 1080i/30, 1080i/25, and 720p/30 is most often used on Blu-ray Disc.

Recording and compression

HDTV can be recorded to D-VHS (Digital-VHS or Data-VHS), W-VHS (analog only), to an HDTV-capable digital video recorder (for example DirecTV's high-definition digital video recorder, Sky HD's set-top box, Dish Network's VIP 622 or VIP 722 high-definition digital video recorder receivers (these set-top boxes allow for HD on the Primary TV and SD on the secondary TV (TV2) without a secondary box on TV2), or TiVo's Series 3 or HD recorders), or an HDTV-ready HTPC. Some cable boxes are capable of receiving or recording two or more broadcasts at a time in HDTV format, and HDTV programming, some included in the monthly cable service subscription price, some for an additional fee, can be played back with the cable company's on-demand feature.

The massive amount of data storage required to archive uncompressed streams meant that inexpensive uncompressed storage options were not available to the consumer. In 2008, the Hauppauge 1212 Personal Video Recorder was introduced. This device accepts HD content through component video inputs and stores the content in MPEG-2 format in a .ts file or in a Blu-ray-compatible format .m2ts file on the hard drive or DVD burner of a computer connected to the PVR through a USB 2.0 interface. More recent systems are able to record a broadcast high definition program in its 'as broadcast' format or transcode to a format more compatible with Blu-ray.

Analog tape recorders with bandwidth capable of recording analog HD signals, such as W-VHS recorders, are no longer produced for the consumer market and are both expensive and scarce in the secondary market.

In the United States, as part of the FCC's plug and play agreement, cable companies are required to provide customers who rent HD set-top boxes with a set-top box with "functional" FireWire (IEEE 1394) on request. None of the direct broadcast satellite providers have offered this feature on any of their supported boxes, but some cable TV companies have. , boxes are not included in the FCC mandate. This content is protected by encryption known as 5C. This encryption can prevent duplication of content or simply limit the number of copies permitted, thus effectively denying most if not all fair use of the content.

See also
 Display motion blur
 Glossary of video terms
 High Efficiency Video Coding
 List of digital television deployments by country
 Optimum HDTV viewing distance
 Ultra-high-definition television (UHD or UHDTV)

References

Further reading
 Joel Brinkley (1997), Defining Vision: The Battle for the Future of Television, New York: Harcourt Brace.
 High Definition Television: The Creation, Development and Implementation of HDTV Technology by Philip J. Cianci (McFarland & Company, 2012)
 Technology, Television, and Competition (New York: Cambridge University Press, 2004)

External links

History
 L'Alta Definizione a Torino 1986–2006 the Italian HDTV experience from 1980s to 2006 in Italian C.R.I.T./RAI
 The HDTV Archive Project

European adoption
 Images formats for HDTV, article from the EBU, Technical Review
 High Definition for Europe a progressive approach, article from the EBU, Technical Review
 High Definition (HD) Image Formats for Television Production, technical report from the EBU

 
Telecommunications-related introductions in 1936
Telecommunications-related introductions in 1990
ATSC
Consumer electronics
Digital television
Film and video technology
History of television
Television terminology